Khomyakovite is an exceedingly rare mineral of the eudialyte group, with formula . The original formula was extended to show the presence of both the cyclic silicate groups and M4-site silicon, according to the nomenclature of the eudialyte group. Some niobium substitutes for tungsten in khomyakovite. Khomyakovite is an iron-analogue of manganokhomyakovite, the second mineral being a bit more common. The two minerals are the only group representatives, beside taseqite, with species-defining strontium, although many other members display strontium diadochy. Khomyakovite is the third eudialyte-group mineral with essential tungsten (after johnsenite-(Ce) and manganokhomyakovite).

Occurrence and association
Khomyakovite, manganokhomyakovite, johnsenite-(Ce) and oneillite are four eudialyte-group minerals with type locality in Mont Saint-Hilaire, Quebec, Canada. Khomyakovite itself is associated with analcime, annite, natrolite, titanite, calcite, and pyrite.

Notes on chemistry
Impurities in khomyakovite include niobium, potassium and manganese, with minor rare earth elements, magnesium, titanium, hafnium and aluminium.

References

Cyclosilicates
Sodium minerals
Strontium minerals
Calcium minerals
Iron minerals
Zirconium minerals
Tungsten minerals
Trigonal minerals
Minerals in space group 160